Llanfair Clydogau is a small village and community encompassing , located about  north-east of Lampeter on the B4343 road, in Ceredigion, Wales. It has a population of 634 as of the 2011 UK census, 87.5% of whom are Welsh-speaking, yet only 46% were born in Wales?. Formerly located within the hundred of Moyddyn.

The community is located at the southernmost area of Ceredigion's former lead and silver mines, which until the 1760s were highly productive. Clydogau refers to the River Clydogau or Clywedogau as it was originally spelt. The meaning of "clywedog" is audible, or noisy. The basins of Clywedog-isaf, Clywedog-ganol and Clywedog-uchaf are nearby.
The community includes the hamlet of Cellan.

There are two churches still in regular use, Saint Mary's Parish Church and the Welsh Independent Capel Mair, built in 1825, which is a Grade II listed building. Both churches have recently received improvements.

Notable people 
 John Thomas (1838–1905), a Welsh photographer of landscape images of Wales and Welsh chapels. He was born at Glanrhyd.
 Local native and scholar G. J. Williams, (1892–1962), the first president of Yr Academi Gymreig (Welsh Academy). 
 John Metcalf (born 1946), a Welsh-Canadian composer; settled here in 1991 in an energy-saving house built from reclaimed materials

Footnotes

References
 The Welsh Academy Encyclopedia of Wales, University of Wales Press, Cardiff, Published 2008, Co-Editors: John Davies, Nigel Jenkins, Menna Baines and Pereduri I. Lynch, 
 GENUKI: Llanfair Clyodau

Villages in Ceredigion